Holonki  (Holionky) is a village in the administrative district of Gmina Brańsk, within Bielsk County, Podlaskie Voivodeship, in north-eastern Poland.

According to the 1921 census, the village was inhabited by 258 people, among whom 235 were Roman Catholic, 16 were Orthodox, and 7 were Mosaic. At the same time, all inhabitants declared Polish nationality. There were 39 residential buildings in the village.

References

Holonki